Rutgers Preparatory School (also known as Rutgers Prep or RPS) is a private, coeducational, college preparatory day school established in 1766. The school educates students in pre-kindergarten through twelfth grade, located on a  campus along the banks of the Delaware and Raritan Canal in the Somerset section of Franklin Township, in Somerset County, New Jersey, United States. Established in 1766, Rutgers Preparatory School is the oldest independent school in the state of New Jersey and the 16th-oldest in the country.

The school has a frequently cited student honor code, and requires its high school students to complete ten hours of community service each school year in order to advance to the next grade level. The vast majority of students take Advanced Placement (AP) courses, and the academic environment at the school is highly competitive. Rutgers Preparatory School is a member of the New Jersey Association of Independent Schools.

As of the 2019–20 school year, the school had an enrollment of 591 students and 79.6 classroom teachers (on an FTE basis), for a student–teacher ratio of 7.4:1. The school's student body was 41.5% (245) White, 33.7% (199) Asian, 22.2% (131) Black and 2.7% (16) Hispanic and 0% (0) two or more races. Tuition for the 2020-21 school year for grades 9-12 was set at $42,500. The school does not publicly release endowment figures, however IRS filings indicate close to $60 million in investable assets alone.

History

Rutgers Preparatory School is the oldest independent preparatory school in the state of New Jersey. Founded as the Queen's College Grammar School, it was established on November 10, 1766 under the same charter that founded Queen's College (now Rutgers University). It was originally located in New Brunswick.

Instruction began on August 15, 1768, under the school's first master Caleb Cooper, a graduate of the College of New Jersey (now Princeton University). In those early years, instruction of students was carried on in various taverns and boarding houses in New Brunswick. From 1809 to 1830, the grammar school shared the Old Queens building with Queens College (after 1825, Rutgers College) and the New Brunswick Theological Seminary.

In 1825, the trustees renamed the college and grammar school after Colonel Henry Rutgers, whose donation allowed the college to reopen after years of financial difficulties. In 1830, the Rutgers College Grammar School moved to a building designed and constructed by local architect and builder Nicholas Wyckoff, at the corner of College Avenue and Somerset Street. From 1829 until 1963, the school operated at this location. The building is now known as Alexander Johnston Hall, and is the second-oldest surviving building on the Rutgers University campus. The Grammar School also included an Elementary School division (now called the Lower School) that was located in its own building nearby on College Avenue.

Though officially nondenominational, the school's original mission was to train young men for the ministry, and its curriculum focused on theology and classical studies. Over the course of the 19th century, however, more modern options were added. During the Progressive Era, Rutgers Preparatory School was among the first schools in the nation to institute a curriculum involving the laboratory sciences, student publications, and community service. Progressive-minded headmasters like Eliot R. Payson (served 1891-1908), Myron T. Scudder (1908-1911) and William P. Kelly (1911-1934) consistently supported the implementation of new educational ideas and methods.

Rutgers Preparatory School opened its doors to international students in the 19th century. In the 1860s, as the Japanese Empire embarked on the reforms of the Meiji Era, several young men from prominent Japanese families enrolled at the school. Notable among them was Matsukata Kōjirō, class of 1884, who later became president of the Kawasaki Dockyard Company and whose art collection served as the nucleus of Japan's National Museum of Western Art. Japanese students continued to attend Rutgers Prep through the early 20th century. Several students from various other regions, particularly Latin America, were also drawn to the school in those years.

Rutgers Prep's lower grades (i.e., 8th grade and below) became coeducational in the 1890s, and have remained so ever since. Coeducation was allowed in the Upper School from 1892 to 1912, during which time some 93 girls were graduated. Coeducation lapsed after 1912, but in 1923 Headmaster William Kelly announced plans to open a girls' school that would operate "as an allied department of the Preparatory School." Seven girls were enrolled, but a lack of support from the community forced Kelly to abandon his plans after only one year.

Rutgers Preparatory School became fully and permanently coeducational in 1951. That same year, it disbanded its football team and ended its boarding program to become a day school. A shakeup of its faculty resulted in the hiring of several young, highly talented teachers and coaches, most of whom would remain at the school for decades. Notable among them were French teachers Al Gaggini and Helene Spratford, science teacher Gus Daviet, history teacher Frank Sperduto, and athletic director Dick O'Connell. In 1953, Dr. David M. Heinlein became Headmaster. One of his priorities was to increase the economic, ethnic, and gender diversity of the school's students and faculty.

In 1956, as Rutgers University became the State University of New Jersey, the university's Board of Trustees decided to divest itself of the preparatory school. The school created its own Board of Trustees and Parents Association, and began looking for a new campus outside of New Brunswick. In early 1958, Rutgers Prep purchased the Wells Estate (also known as Elm Farm) in nearby Somerset. The Wells family was eager to sell the property to the school partly because Elm Farm had originally been the home of Abraham Beach, one of Queens College Grammar School's co-founders in the 1760s. By the end of 1958, Rutgers University and Rutgers Preparatory School had officially separated from one another. Rutgers Prep's Lower School began operating at Elm Farm that fall. The Upper School remained in its old quarters in New Brunswick until 1963, when a new upper school building, constructed with the assistance of the Colgate-Palmolive Company, opened at Elm Farm. Since 1963, all divisions of the school have been located on the same campus.

The school expanded rapidly in its new setting. A field house was built in 1968, and, shortly afterward, a center for early childhood education. During the 1960s, the school's curriculum, athletic program, and extracurricular offerings all expanded dramatically.

Despite the economic downturn of the mid-1970s, Rutgers Prep continued to grow. It added a Middle School and a larger library in 1974. Athletic Director O'Connell introduced and vigorously promoted an athletic program for the school's female population. By the end of the 1970s, the school was much larger and more diverse than it had been a generation earlier.

In November 1983, an electrical fire destroyed a large part of the Upper School building. Classes were held in trailers while a new, larger, and more modern Upper School was built. The new building, which is still in use, opened in 1985. During the 1980s, Rutgers Preparatory School also aggressively supported the application of technology to education, creating a computer science department and encouraging computer literacy in all grades.

In 1992, Dr. Steven Loy became headmaster and embarked on a series of campus expansions funded by a capital campaign. The new construction included a second gymnasium, an art studio, a music building, and a new library shared by all three school divisions. The campus was also fully wired for Internet access.

Academics
Rutgers Preparatory School offers three levels of education: a Lower School serving pre-kindergarten to grade five, a Middle School offering grades six to eight and an Upper School offering traditional secondary level education from grades nine to twelve. Students are required to complete twenty course credits in order to graduate, accumulating a minimum of five credits per year, and are to take courses based in a traditional liberal arts curriculum that spans across several academic departments (English, History, Mathematics, Science, World Languages, Art, Computers, Music, and Drama).

The school offers a wide variety of AP (Advanced Placement) courses, which are the high school equivalent of a college-level course. Additionally, the School offers five language courses: Spanish, French, Latin, Japanese, and Arabic. Rutgers Preparatory School has also partnered with the Waksman Institute of Microbiology at Rutgers University, and by participating in its Waksman Student Scholars Program (WSSP), Upper School students are able to participate in, and contribute to, an authentic research project in molecular biology and bioinformatics.

Each student in the Upper School is required to perform a minimum of ten hours of community service during each academic year as a condition for advancing to the next grade level and for graduation.  This community-service obligation may be fulfilled either through volunteer work with a non-profit organization, through a charity, or through a service that in some way benefits the school community (tutoring, etc.). In addition, at least five of these hours must be completed outside the school campus.

Matriculation 
The school has a 100% college admissions rate. A majority of the students are given offers of admission to selective public and private universities in the Northeast and throughout the country.

Institutional awards and recognition
Rutgers Preparatory School is accredited by the Middle States Association of Colleges and Schools and was recognized in 1992 as a National Blue Ribbon School Award of Excellence by the United States Department of Education.

The School received its most recent accreditation from the New Jersey Association of Independent Schools (NJAIS) in 2012.

The school's delegation was awarded first place in the 2010 Euro Challenge, an international high school economics competition.

In 2014, Rutgers Preparatory School received the Franklin Township Organization Environmental Stewardship Award, in recognition of contributions to the environment of Franklin Township, including participation in the "Rutgers Green Purchasing" and "River-Friendly School Certification" programs, recent construction of a new LEED certified building, new energy management installations, and development of an effective composting and recycling program.

Rutgers Preparatory School is the only school in New Jersey to be a member of the Council of International Schools. It is also the only high school in the world to be granted Non-governmental Organization (NGO) status by the United Nations.

Campus

The  campus is located in Somerset, New Jersey directly on the Delaware and Raritan Canal and the Raritan River. The historic Elm Farm house, built in the mid-18th century, was the home of local minister Abraham Beach, one of the co-founders of the school. Elm Farm was the country estate of the Wells family during the 19th and early 20th centuries. The school purchased it in 1958. Elm Farm now houses administrative offices and several classrooms. The campus includes three full-size athletic fields, a FieldTurf synthetic turf field, a softball field, and a full size baseball field. The "Field House" currently features two full size gyms, male and female locker rooms with showers, a wrestling room, a fitness center, and the offices of the athletic administration and trainer. In addition to the Early Childhood Education Center, and Lower, Middle, and Upper School buildings, an art studio was constructed in 1992 and a new music building was constructed in 2001.

In 2009, the school broke ground on a multimillion-dollar, multi-phased endeavor that includes an expansion of the system of roads and parking on the campus, a widening of Easton Avenue, the addition of new athletic fields and tennis courts, and the construction of an entirely new complex. The first phase of the new complex, which was completed for the 2011-2012 school year, houses the dining commons and several new classrooms on the first floor. The second floor of this new building was completed in Fall 2012, and includes several more upper school classrooms as well as a state-of-the-art all-division room and other multi-use spaces. This new facility is LEED certified.

Music

Lower School 
Students in Lower School grade Pre-k to 3rd grade partake in music class twice a week for 30 minutes. 4th and 5th graders participate "Musical Performance" class daily. Music Performance classes include Band, Choir, and Orchestra and the student chooses which class they would prefer to take. At the end of the year, 5th and 6th graders also participate in a concert at the end of the year were they show off some of the music they were working on.

Middle school 
Once in Middle School, all students still must take Band, Choir, or Orchestra, but the class only occurs 3 days a week. Middle school students also participate in 2 concerts throughout the year, once in the Winter, and again in the Spring. The Upper School also participates in the concerts with them. Band Choir, and Orchestra all participate in separate concerts. In addition, Middle school band students may also participate in middle school Jazz Band, which takes place once a week during the study hall period and is invite only.

Upper School 
Once in the Upper School, students are no longer required to take music classes, but they are encouraged to do so. Upper schoolers also have many different options available to them in Upper school music as well. Music classes that upper school students may take include:

Orchestra 

 Upper School Orchestra
 No requirements
 Every day for 30 minutes (9th period)
 Chamber Orchestra
 Approve by instructor and a minimum for 4 years of experience are required
 3 days a week, 2 ether 60–70 minutes, 1 40 minutes

Band 

 Concert Band
 No requirements
 Every day for 30 minutes (9th period)
 Brass Ensemble
 Approval of the instructor, and student must demonstrate a high interest and good skills
 3 days a week, 2 ether 60–70 minutes, 1 40 minutes
 Saxophone Ensemble
 Approval of the instructor, and student must demonstrate a high interest and good skills
 3 days a week, 2 ether 60–70 minutes, 1 40 minutes
 Woodwind Ensemble
 Approval of the instructor, and student must demonstrate a high interest and good skills
 3 days a week, 2 ether 60–70 minutes, 1 40 minutes

Choir 

 Concert Choir
 No requirements
 Every day for 30 minutes (9th period)
 Madrigals Ensemble (auditioned)
 Approval from instructor from auditions and enrollment in an additional musical ensemble
 3 days a week, 2 ether 60–70 minutes, 1 40 minutes
 Women’s Vocal Chamber Ensemble (auditioned)
 Approval by instructor by auditions or invite
 3 days a week, 2 ether 60–70 minutes, 1 40 minutes

Music Theory 

 Music Theory
 Approval by instructor
 3 days a week, 2 ether 60–70 minutes, 1 40 minutes

Other Info 
Since the late 1990s, the Rutgers Preparatory School Madrigal Singers have been attending the New Jersey American Choral Directors Association High School Choral Festival, and have regularly received ratings of "Superior." In 2000, 2008 and 2019, the Madrigal Singers performed at Carnegie Hall. In 2013 and 2014 flute players from the School's Music Department performed at Carnegie Hall with Sir James Galway.

Athletics
The Rutgers Prep Argonauts compete as a member school in the Skyland Conference, which is comprised of public and private high schools covering Hunterdon County, Somerset County and Warren County and operates under the auspices of the New Jersey State Interscholastic Athletic Association (NJSIAA). The athletic program fields 44 high school and middle school teams, including 15 varsity athletic teams. Boys' teams include soccer, basketball, baseball, tennis, lacrosse, wrestling, and cross country. Girls' teams consist of: soccer, basketball, softball, volleyball, cross country, tennis and lacrosse. Additionally, the school has two co-ed teams: golf and swimming. Rutgers Prep is a member of the NJSIAA Non-Public B, NJISAA Prep B, and Skyland Conferences.

Rutgers Prep also had a no-cut policy, Meaning that students who want to participate are guaranteed to make a team, but still have no guarantee on receiving playing time.

NJSIAA state champions 
 Baseball - 2013 (won Non-Public B title vs. Morris Catholic High School)
 Boys lacrosse - 2013 (won the Non-Public B title, defeating Immaculata High School in the title game)
 Girls basketball - 2016 (won the Non-Public Group B state title, defeating Saddle River Day School in the tournament final) and 2017 (vs. Queen of Peace High School)
 Girls soccer - 2019 (won the Non-Public Group B state championship against runner-up Saddle River Day School).
 Boys Cross Country – 1990, 1996
 Girls Cross Country – 1997, 2002
 Boys Basketball – 1956, 1972, 1979, 1981, 1986, 1987, 1988, 1991, 2005, 2009, 2011, 2012
 Girls Basketball – 1992, 1997, 2001, 2003, 2004, 2006, 2007, 2008, 2009, 2011, 2012
 Volleyball – 1992, 2002, 2005, 2011
 Wrestling – 1993, 1999, 2000, 2001, 2002, 2003, 2004, 2005, 2007, 2009
 Swimming – 1991, 2001
 Boys Lacrosse – 1988, 1989, 1990, 2009, 2010, 2013, 2019
 Girls Lacrosse – 1986, 1999, 2002
 Golf – 1987
 Baseball – 1988, 2011, 2012, 2016, 2019
 Softball – 1988, 2005, 2007, 2008, 2009, 2010
 Boys Tennis – 2001, 2002, 2004
 Girls Tennis – 2000
 Girls Soccer – 2004, 2005, 2006, 2007, 2008

NJSIAA sectional championships 
 Baseball – 2013
Girls Basketball - 2016, 2017, 2018
Boys Tennis - 2018
Boys Soccer - 2018
Girls Soccer - 2019

Somerset County Championships 
 Boys Tennis – 2001
 Boys Basketball - 1979, 1981, 1983
 Girls Basketball – 2004, 2008, 2011, 2015, 2016, 2017
Baseball - 2017

Patriot Conference Championships (1985 and later) 
 Boys Cross Country – 1986, 1990, 1995, 1996
 Girls Cross Country – 1996, 1997, 1998
 Boys Lacrosse – 2006, 2007, 2008, 2009, 2010
 Girls Soccer - 2004, 2006
 Boys Basketball – 1985, 1986, 1987, 1988, 1989, 1990, 1992, 1995, 2004, 2005, 2009
 Girls Basketball – 1997, 2001, 2002, 2003, 2004, 2005, 2006, 2007, 2008, 2009
 Volleyball – 1992, 1996, 1997, 1998, 1999, 2002, 2003, 2004, 2005, 2006, 2007, 2008, 2009
 Wrestling – 1994, 1995, 1996,1997, 1998, 1999, 2000, 2001, 2002, 2003, 2004, 2005, 2007
 Golf – 1996, 1998, 2010
 Boys Tennis – 2001, 2003, 2004
 Baseball – 2002, 2003, 2004, 2005, 2006, 2008
 Softball – 2000, 2005, 2007, 2008, 2009, 2010

Skyland Conference Championships 

 Boys Basketball - Delaware Division - 2015
 Boys Tennis - Valley Division - 2015, 2016, 2017, 2019
 Girls Soccer - 2019
 Girls Tennis - Mountain Division - 2018
 Volleyball - Raritan Division -2015
 Girls Basketball -Raritan Division - 2016, 2017, 2018, 2019
 Boys Cross Country - Mountain Division - 2017, 2018
 Girls Cross Country - Mountain Division - 2017, 2018
 Girls Soccer - Mountain Division - 2017
 Baseball - Mountain Division - 2019

In recent years, student-athletes have been awarded individual honors including:
 All-American
 All-State
 All-Metro Region
 All- Prep B
 All- Prep
 All-Somerset County
 All-Area
 All-Non-Public
 Player of the Year 
 All-Skyland Conference

Student publications
The Argo — Award-winning monthly newspaper
Excelsior — biannual literary magazine
Ye Dial — school yearbook

Notable alumni

 Marvadene Anderson (born 1993), basketball player.
* Jesús Arango Cano (1915-2015), Colombian economist, diplomat, anthropologist, archaeologist and writer.
 James Bishop (1816-1895), politician who represented New Jersey's 3rd congressional district in the United States House of Representatives from 1855–1857.
 William Henry Steele Demarest (1863–1956), Minister, President of Rutgers College (1906–1924) and President of the New Brunswick Theological Seminary (1924–1934).
 Fred A. Hartley Jr. (1902–1969), member of the United States House of Representatives who sponsored the Taft–Hartley Act.
 Robert Wood Johnson II (1893–1968), chairman of Johnson & Johnson.
 Stanley Kamel (1943–2008), actor who appeared on the television series Monk.
 Aline Murray Kilmer (1888–1941), poet and author.
 Joyce Kilmer (1886–1918), poet and World War I soldier.
* Keshia Knight Pulliam (born 1979), actress who appeared on the television series The Cosby Show.
 Leroy Lins (1913-1986), professional basketball player who played for the Akron Goodyear Wingfoots in the National Basketball League.
 Kōjirō Matsukata (1865-1950), son of Japanese Prime Minister Matsukata Masayoshi and future director of Kawasaki Dockyard Company.
 Judy Melick (born 1954, class of 1972), former competition swimmer who participated as part of the U.S. team at the 1972 Summer Olympics.
 Zach Perez (born 1996), professional soccer player who plays as a defender for USL League One club Richmond Kickers.
 Max Raab (1926–2008), film producer who made his initial fortune in the garment industry.
 Marc Turtletaub (born 1946, class of 1963), film producer.
 Breein Tyree (born 1998), point guard / shooting guard for the Ole Miss Rebels men's basketball team.
 Constance H. Williams (born 1944), politician who served from 2001 to 2009 in the Pennsylvania State Senate.

See also
 Queens Campus, Rutgers University
 History of Rutgers University
Rutgers University 
Rutgers Prep Twitter
Rutgers Prep Instagram

References

External links
 Rutgers Preparatory School website
 The Argo (Student Publication)
 College Acceptances, 2010-2014
Data for Rutgers Preparatory School, National Center for Education Statistics

1766 establishments in New Jersey
Educational institutions established in 1766
Franklin Township, Somerset County, New Jersey
New Jersey Association of Independent Schools
Preparatory schools in New Jersey
Private K-12 schools in New Jersey
Private high schools in Somerset County, New Jersey
Rutgers University